Denmark first participated at the Olympic Games at the inaugural 1896 Games, and has sent athletes to compete in every Summer Olympic Games since then, except for the sparsely attended 1904 Games.  Denmark has also participated in the Winter Olympic Games several times since 1948, including every Games since 1988.

The top medal-producing sport for Denmark is sailing.  Denmark has won only a single medal at the Winter Games, in curling at the 1998 Winter Olympics. 

The National Olympic Committee for Denmark was created in 1905.

Medal tables

Medals by Summer Games

Medals by Winter Games

Medals by summer sport

Medals by winter sport

List of medalists

Medals by individual 
According to official data of the International Olympic Committee. This is a list of people who have won one or more Olympic gold medals and three or more Olympic medals for Denmark. Medals won in the 1906 Intercalated Games are not included. It includes top-three placings in 1896 and 1900, before medals were awarded for top-three placings.

Medals by team 
Denmark has been successful at the Olympics in team sports like football, handball and team gymnastics. In football Denmark has won four medals. Also team gymnastics has given Denmark four medals. In women's handball Denmark has won three gold medals.

Summer Olympics 
All Danish medals are listed.

Winter Olympics 
Denmark has won a single medal.

Summary by sport

Aquatics

Swimming

Denmark first competed in swimming in 1900, sending one swimmer who competed in one event and won one (bronze) medal.

Athletics

Denmark first competed in track and field athletics in 1896, sending 3 men. The nation has not yet won a gold medal in the sport, earning silver four times and bronze thrice. The nation's first medal was a bronze in 1900, when Ernst Schultz placed third in the 400 metres.

Fencing

Denmark had a single sabreur at the 1896 Games, winning the bronze medal.

Gymnastics

Denmark first competed in gymnastics in the inaugural 1896 Olympics, with weightlifter Viggo Jensen entering the rope climbing competition and finishing fourth out of five.

Sailing

Shooting

Denmark competed in shooting at the inaugural 1896 Games, competing in all five events and earning a silver and two bronze medals. The nation's first gold medal in the sport came in 1900, with Lars Jørgen Madsen's victory in the standing free rifle.

Weightlifting

Denmark first competed in weightlifting at the inaugural 1896 Games, with one lifter competing. Viggo Jensen won the two-hand lift (based on a style tie-breaker), but was injured in the attempt and placed second in the one-hand lift. It remains, as of the 2016 Games, the only gold medal won by Denmark in the sport.

See also
 List of flag bearers for Denmark at the Olympics
 :Category:Olympic competitors for Denmark
 Denmark at the Paralympics

External links